Dalton Glacier is a broad glacier on the east side of the Alexandra Mountains on Edward VII Peninsula, flowing northward into Butler Glacier just south of Sulzberger Bay. It was mapped from surveys by the United States Geological Survey and from U.S. Navy air photos (1959–65), and named by the Advisory Committee on Antarctic Names for Lieutenant Brian C. Dalton, MC, U.S. Navy, officer in charge at Byrd Station, 1957. Blades Glacier merges with Dalton Glacier on the north side of Edward VII Peninsula.

See also
 List of glaciers in the Antarctic
 Glaciology

References
 

Glaciers of King Edward VII Land